BDQ may refer to:

Transport 
 Bradford Forster Square railway station, in West Yorkshire, England
 Morrilton Municipal Airport, in Arkansas, United States
 Vadodara Airport, in Gujarat, India

Other uses 
 Bahnar language, a language of Vietnam
 Quebec comics
 Vietnamese Rangers, of South Vietnam